In the fields of actuarial science and financial economics there are a number of ways that risk can be defined; to clarify the concept theoreticians have described a number of properties that a risk measure might or might not have. A coherent risk measure is a function that satisfies properties of monotonicity, sub-additivity, homogeneity, and translational invariance.

Properties
Consider a random outcome  viewed as an element of a linear space  of measurable functions, defined on an appropriate probability space. A functional  →  is said to be coherent risk measure for  if it satisfies the following properties:

Normalized
 
That is, the risk when holding no assets is zero.

Monotonicity
 
E.g.
In financial risk management, monotonicity implies a portfolio with greater future returns has less risk.

Sub-additivity
 
Indeed, the risk of two portfolios together cannot get any worse than adding the two risks separately: this is the diversification principle.
In financial risk management, sub-additivity implies diversification is beneficial. The sub-additivity principle is sometimes also seen as problematic.

Positive homogeneity
 
Loosely speaking, if you double your portfolio then you double your risk.
In financial risk management, positive homogeneity implies the risk of a position is proportional to its size.

Translation invariance
If  is a deterministic portfolio with guaranteed return  and  then
 
The portfolio  is just adding cash  to your portfolio . In particular, if   then . 
In financial risk management, translation invariance implies that the addition of a sure amount of capital reduces the risk by the same amount.

Convex risk measures
The notion of coherence has been subsequently relaxed. Indeed, the notions of Sub-additivity and Positive Homogeneity can be replaced by the notion of convexity:
 Convexity

Examples of risk measure

Value at risk 

It is well known that value at risk is not a coherent risk measure as it does not respect the sub-additivity property. An immediate consequence is that value at risk might discourage diversification.
Value at risk is, however, coherent, under the assumption of elliptically distributed losses (e.g. normally distributed) when the portfolio value is a linear function of the asset prices. However, in this case the value at risk becomes equivalent to a mean-variance approach where the risk of a portfolio is measured by the variance of the portfolio's return.

The non-concavity of   proves the non coherence of this risk measure.

Illustration

As a simple example to demonstrate the non-coherence of value-at-risk consider looking at the VaR of a portfolio at 95% confidence over the next year of two default-able zero coupon bonds that mature in 1 years time denominated in our numeraire currency.

Assume the following:
 The current yield on the two bonds is 0%
 The two bonds are from different issuers
 Each bond has a 4% probability of defaulting over the next year
 The event of default in either bond is independent of the other
 Upon default the bonds have a recovery rate of 30%

Under these conditions the 95% VaR for holding either of the bonds is 0 since the probability of default is less than 5%. However if we held a portfolio that consisted of 50% of each bond by value then the 95% VaR is 35% (= 0.5*0.7 + 0.5*0) since the probability of at least one of the bonds defaulting is 7.84% (= 1 - 0.96*0.96) which exceeds 5%. This violates the sub-additivity property showing that VaR is not a coherent risk measure.

Average value at risk
The average value at risk (sometimes called expected shortfall or conditional value-at-risk or ) is a coherent risk measure, even though it is derived from Value at Risk which is not.  The domain can be extended for more general Orlitz Hearts from the more typical Lp spaces.

Entropic value at risk
The entropic value at risk is a coherent risk measure.

Tail value at risk
The tail value at risk (or tail conditional expectation) is a coherent risk measure only when the underlying distribution is continuous.

The concavity of   proves the coherence of this risk measure in the case of continuous distribution.

Proportional Hazard (PH) risk measure 
The PH risk measure (or Proportional Hazard Risk measure) transforms the hazard rates  using a  coefficient .

The concavity of   if  proves the coherence of this risk measure.

g-Entropic risk measures
g-entropic risk measures are a class of information-theoretic coherent risk measures that involve some important cases such as CVaR and EVaR.

The Wang risk measure 

The Wang risk measure is defined by the following Wang transform function (distortion function)  .

Entropic risk measure
The entropic risk measure is a convex risk measure which is not coherent.  It is related to the exponential utility.

Superhedging price
The superhedging price is a coherent risk measure.

Set-valued
Set-valued risk measures are useful for markets with transaction costs.

Properties

 Normalized
 

 Translative in M
 

 Monotone
 

 Sublinear

General framework of Wang transform 

Wang transform of the cumulative distribution function

This function is called distortion function or Wang transform function.

Given a probability space , then for any random variable  and any distortion function  we can define a new probability measure  such that for any  it follows that
 

Actuarial premium principle

For any increasing concave Wang transform function, we could define a corresponding premium principle :

Coherent risk measure 

A coherent risk measure  could be defined by a Wang transform of the cumulative distribution function   if and only if    is concave.

Set-valued convex risk measure
If instead of the sublinear property,R is convex, then R is a set-valued convex risk measure.

Dual representation
A lower semi-continuous convex risk measure  can be represented as
 
The dual characterization is tied to  spaces, Orlitz hearts, and their dual spaces.

A lower semi-continuous risk measure is coherent if and only if it can be represented as
 
such that .

See also
 Risk metric - the abstract concept that a risk measure quantifies
 RiskMetrics - a model for risk management
 Spectral risk measure - a subset of coherent risk measures
 Distortion risk measure
 Conditional value-at-risk
 Entropic value at risk
 Financial risk

References

Actuarial science
Financial risk modeling